Ljusfallshammar is a locality situated in Finspång Municipality, Östergötland County, Sweden with 327 inhabitants in 2010.

References 

Populated places in Östergötland County
Populated places in Finspång Municipality